Are You a Failure? is a 1923 American silent comedy film directed by Tom Forman and starring Madge Bellamy, Lloyd Hughes and Tom Santschi.

Cast
 Madge Bellamy as Phyllis Thorpe
 Lloyd Hughes as Oliver Wendell Blaine
 Tom Santschi as Kildevil Brenon
 Hardee Kirkland as Gregory Thorpe
 Jane Keckley as Aunt Emily
 Hallam Cooley as Emmett Graves
 Sam Allen as Thaddeus Crane
 Myrtle Vane as Aunt Charlotte

References

Bibliography
 Munden, Kenneth White. The American Film Institute Catalog of Motion Pictures Produced in the United States, Part 1. University of California Press, 1997.

External links
 
 

1923 films
1923 comedy films
1920s English-language films
American silent feature films
Silent American comedy films
American black-and-white films
Films directed by Tom Forman
Preferred Pictures films
1920s American films